Justin Mapletoft (born January 11, 1981) is a Canadian former professional ice hockey centre. He was drafted by the New York Islanders in the 1999 NHL Entry Draft as their fifth-round pick, number 130 overall.

He played 38 NHL games with the Islanders in addition to his four seasons with the Bridgeport Sound Tigers in the AHL.

After being recommended by his Tigers linemate Sean Bergenheim, Mapletoft signed with Jokerit in the Finnish SM-liiga for the 2005–06 season, but after a disappointing early season, the team invoked a buyout clause in his contract at the beginning of November 2005, ending his season with Jokerit. He subsequently signed with Södertälje SK in the Swedish Elitserien.  The following summer, he signed a one-year contract with the Ottawa Senators. He played  for the EC VSV in the Austrian league in 2008/09.

He played two seasons for the Straubing Tigers of the Deutsche Eishockey Liga.

Career statistics

Awards and honours

References

External links

1981 births
Living people
Binghamton Senators players
Bridgeport Sound Tigers players
Canadian ice hockey centres
EC VSV players
Sportspeople from Lloydminster
Jokerit players
New York Islanders draft picks
New York Islanders players
Red Deer Rebels players
Södertälje SK players
Straubing Tigers players
Ice hockey people from Alberta
Canadian expatriate ice hockey players in Austria
Canadian expatriate ice hockey players in Finland
Canadian expatriate ice hockey players in Germany
Canadian expatriate ice hockey players in Sweden